U is the twenty-first letter of the Latin alphabet.

U may also refer to:

Science

Mathematics
 , union (set theory)
 U-set, a set of uniqueness
 U, the unitary group

Chemistry
 Uranium, symbol U, a chemical element
 u, the Dalton (unit), a unified atomic mass unit to express atomic and molecular masses

Astronomy
 U, ultraviolet magnitude, in a UBV photometric system
 U, an October 16 through 31 discovery in the provisional designation of a comet
 U (TNO), a possible extremely distant trans-Neptunian object

Computing
 <u>, a now-deprecated HTML element denoting underlined text
 U, representing 1.75" as the minimal height of a rack unit
 U, representing a 10x10x10cm CubeSat
 U, universal Turing machine

Biology 
 U, abbreviation for uracil
 U, mitochondrial haplogroup U

Other scientific uses
 U, a common notation for potential energy
 U, the middle of an edge joining a hexagonal and a square face of the Brillouin zone of a face-centered cubic lattice, in solid-state physics
 U, one of the two subcarrier-modulated color-difference channels in the YUV colorspace, in video
 U, the recommended symbol for a system's internal energy, in thermodynamics
 U, units, any of various standard units of biological activity, such as insulin units, enzyme units, or penicillin units
 U, the enzyme unit
 International units, for which the symbol U is sometimes used
 U, the abbreviation for selenocysteine, an uncommon amino acid containing selenium
 u, the alternative abbreviation for the SI prefix "micro-" when the Greek letter mu (µ) is not available
 U or U-value, the symbol for the overall heat transfer coefficient or thermal transmittance

Music
 ’u’, the first opera in the Klingon language
 "U" (Kendrick Lamar song), 2015
 "U" (Super Junior song), 2006
 U (album), a 1970 double album by the Incredible String Band
 U (NiziU album), an album by NiziU, released in 2021
 "U", a song by KNK from Remain
 "U", a song by Pearl Jam on their album Lost Dogs
 "U", a song by S.E.S., released in 2002
 "U", an album by The Enid, released in 2019
 "U", a song by Treasure (band), released in 2022

People
 An honorific used in Burmese names
 An alternative spelling of Woo (Korean surname), including a list of people with that family name
 An alternative spelling of Woo (Korean given name), including a list of people with that given name
 U of Goryeo (1363–1389), king of Goryeo (Korea), often called King Woo

Places
 U, Pohnpei, Federated States of Micronesia
 Ü-Tsang, one of three historical provinces of Tibet
 Ü (region), a particular region of Ü-Tsang

Education
 University, commonly abbreviated "U"

Language
 /u/, the close back rounded vowel in the International Phonetic Alphabet
 U language, a language spoken by about 40,000 people in the Yunnan Province of China
 U (cuneiform), a cuneiform sign
 U (Cyrillic), a letter of the Cyrillic script
 U (kana), a Japanese syllabary symbol
 U and non-U English, sociolectal varieties of British English
 Ս, glyph for the Romanian letter se
 u, an abbreviation for "you" in computer chats
 U-, a prefix used for German submarines during World War II
 U, a title roughly equal to "Mister" in Burmese
 The Greek letter μ

Film and television
 U (film), a 2006 French animated feature film directed by Serge Elissalde and Grégoire Solotareff
 The U (film), a 2009 documentary about the Miami Hurricanes football team
 U (Universal), a media content rating used in the following countries: 
 United Kingdom, issued by the British Board of Film Classification
 India, issued by the Central Board of Film Certification
 Malaysia, issued by the Film Censorship Board of Malaysia
 France, documented at Censorship in France
 Latvia, Malaysia and Malta, documented at Motion picture content rating system and Television content rating system
 U (TV channel), a former television channel in New Zealand
 U, the production code for the 1965 Doctor Who serial The Myth Makers
The American Spanish-language network Univision has the U logo

Other uses
 U Mobile, Malaysian mobile phone and data service provider
 U-bend, a U-shaped plumbing trap
 U-bolt, a U-shaped metal fastener
 Ⓤ, (U inside a circle), hechsher or kosher certification by the Orthodox Union
 U, =U= or -U-, symbol for Ustaše Croatian movement 
 Nickname for football teams:
 La U or Universitario de Deportes, Peru
 Universitatea Cluj, Romania
 U, the color blue in Magic: The Gathering
 Wii U, the sixth Nintendo video game home console, released in 2012
 Uniform, the military time zone code for UTC−08:00
 "U" Is for Undertow, the twenty-first novel in Sue Grafton's "Alphabet" mystery series, published in 2009
 Underscore, originally invoked in HTML using <u>
 U, a brand of menstrual hygiene products by Kotex
 U, the logo for Unilever

See also
 U class (disambiguation)
 You (disambiguation)